The American Jewish Press Association (AJPA) is an organization of Jewish newspapers, magazines, journalists, and affiliated organizations in North America. It was established in 1944 and is based in Phoenix, Arizona. Back then the Jewish Press was referred to as 'Anglo-Jewish press' and some publishers and editors were not comfortable with this tag. This organization was the brainchild of Gabriel Cohen, editor and publisher of the National Jewish Post & Opinion.

Rockower Awards

The AJPA gives the annual Rockower Awards. "Billed by some as the 'Jewish Pulitzers," the Rockower Awards were started in 1980 to provide incentive to Jewish media to improve their publications and to promote quality Jewish journalism."

References

External links
American Jewish Press Association official site

Jewish media
Jewish printing and publishing
Jews and Judaism in Phoenix, Arizona
Organizations based in Phoenix, Arizona